Robert Raymond "Bart" Bartholomew (February 9, 1936 – June 30, 2021) was an American weightlifter. He competed in the men's middle heavyweight event at the 1968 Summer Olympics.

References

External links
 

1936 births
2021 deaths
American male weightlifters
Olympic weightlifters of the United States
Weightlifters at the 1968 Summer Olympics
Sportspeople from Allentown, Pennsylvania
20th-century American people
21st-century American people